The Rhineland (Latinised name: Rhenania) is a loosely defined area of Western Germany along the Rhine, chiefly its middle section.

Term

Historically, the Rhinelands refers (physically speaking) to a loosely defined region embracing the land on the banks of the  Rhine in Central Europe, which were settled by Ripuarian and Salian Franks and became part of Frankish Austrasia. In the High Middle Ages, numerous Imperial States along the river emerged from the former stem duchy of Lotharingia, without developing any common political or cultural identity.

A "Rhineland" conceptualization can be traced to the period of the Holy Roman Empire from the sixteenth until the eighteenth centuries when the Empire's Imperial Estates (territories) were grouped into regional districts in charge of defence and judicial execution, known as Imperial Circles. Three of the ten circles through which the Rhine flowed referred to the river in their names: the Upper Rhenish Circle, the Electoral Rhenish Circle and the Lower Rhenish-Westphalian Circle (very roughly equivalent to the present-day German federal state of North Rhine Westphalia). In the twilight period of the Empire, after the War of the First Coalition, a short-lived Cisrhenian Republic was established (1797–1802). The term covered the whole French conquered territory west of the Rhine, but also including a small portion of the bridgeheads on the eastern banks. After the collapse of the French empire, the regions of Jülich-Cleves-Berg and Lower Rhine were annexed to the Kingdom of Prussia. In 1822 the Prussian administration reorganized the territory as the Rhine Province (Rheinprovinz, also known as Rhenish Prussia), a tradition that continued in the naming of the current German states of Rhineland-Palatinate and North Rhine-Westphalia. 

Following the First World War, the western part of Rhineland was occupied by Entente forces, then demilitarized under the 1919 Treaty of Versailles and then the 1925 Locarno Treaties. German forces remilitarized the territory in 1936, as part of a diplomatic test of will, three years before the outbreak of the Second World War.

Geography

To the west the area stretches to the borders with Luxembourg, Belgium and the Netherlands; on the eastern side it encompasses the towns and cities along the river and the Bergisches Land area up to the Westphalian (Siegerland) and Hessian regions. Stretching down to the North Palatine Uplands in the south, this area, except for the Saarland, more or less corresponds with the modern use of the term. 

The southern and eastern parts are mainly hill country (Westerwald, Hunsrück, Siebengebirge, Taunus and Eifel), cut by river valleys, principally the Middle Rhine up to Bingen (or very rarely between the confluence with the Neckar and Cologne) and its Ahr, Moselle and Nahe tributaries. The border of the North German plain is marked by the lower Ruhr. In the south, the river cuts the Rhenish Massif.

The area encompasses the western part of the Ruhr industrial region and the Cologne Lowland. Some of the larger cities in the Rhineland are Aachen, Bonn, Cologne, Duisburg, Düsseldorf, Essen, Koblenz, Krefeld, Leverkusen, Mainz, Mönchengladbach, Mülheim an der Ruhr, Oberhausen, Remscheid, Solingen, Trier and Wuppertal.

Toponyms as well as local family names often trace back to the Frankish heritage. The lands on the western shore of the Rhine are strongly characterized by Roman influence, including viticulture. In the core territories, large parts of the population are members of the Catholic Church.

History

Pre-Roman
At the earliest historical period, the territories between the Ardennes and the Rhine were occupied by the Treveri, the Eburones and other Celtic tribes, who, however, were all more or less modified and influenced by their Germanic neighbors. On the East bank of the Rhine, between the Main and the Lahn, were the settlements of the Mattiaci, a branch of the Germanic Chatti, while farther to the north were the Usipetes and Tencteri.

Roman and Frankish conquests

Julius Caesar conquered the Celtic tribes on the West bank, and Augustus established numerous fortified posts on the Rhine, but the Romans never succeeded in gaining a firm footing on the East bank. As the power of the Roman empire declined the Franks pushed forward along both banks of the Rhine, and by the end of the 5th century had conquered all the lands that had formerly been under Roman influence. By the 8th century, the Frankish dominion was firmly established in western Germania and northern Gaul.

On the division of the Carolingian Empire at the Treaty of Verdun the part of the province to the east of the river fell to East Francia, while that to the west remained with the kingdom of Lotharingia.

Holy Roman Empire

By the time of Emperor Otto I (d. 973) both banks of the Rhine had become part of the Holy Roman Empire, and in 959 the Rhenish territory was divided between the duchies of Upper Lorraine, on the Mosel, and Lower Lorraine on the Meuse.

As the central power of the Holy Roman Emperor weakened, the Rhineland disintegrated into numerous small independent principalities, each with its separate vicissitudes and special chronicles. The old Lotharingian divisions became obsolete, and while the Lower Lorraine lands were referred to as the Low Countries, the name of Lorraine became restricted to the region on the upper Moselle  that still bears it. After the Imperial Reform of 1500/12, the territory was part of the Lower Rhenish–Westphalian, Upper Rhenish, and Electoral Rhenish Circles. Notable Rhenish Imperial States included:
the ecclesiastical electorates of Cologne (without Westphalian possessions) and Trier
the duchies of Jülich, Cleves, and Berg, forming the United Duchies of Jülich-Cleves-Berg from 1521
the County of Sponheim and numerous further Imperial Counties
the Free Imperial Cities of Aachen and Cologne.

In spite of its dismembered condition and the sufferings it underwent at the hands of its French neighbors in various periods of warfare, the Rhenish territory prospered greatly and stood in the foremost rank of German culture and progress. Aachen was the place of coronation of the German emperors, and the ecclesiastical principalities of the Rhine played a large role in German history.

French Revolution

At the Peace of Basel in 1795, the whole of the left bank of the Rhine was taken by France. The population was about 1.6 million in numerous small states.  In 1806, the Rhenish princes all joined the Confederation of the Rhine, a puppet of Napoleon.  France took direct control of the Rhineland until 1814 and radically and permanently liberalized the government, society and economy. The Coalition of France's enemies made repeated efforts to retake the region, but France repelled all the attempts.  

The French swept away centuries worth of outmoded restrictions and introduced unprecedented levels of efficiency.  The chaos and barriers in a land divided and subdivided among many different petty principalities gave way to a rational, simplified, centralized system controlled by Paris and run by Napoleon's relatives. The most important impact came from the abolition of all feudal privileges and historic taxes, the introduction of legal reforms of the Napoleonic Code, and the reorganization of the judicial and local administrative systems.  The economic integration of the Rhineland with France increased prosperity, especially in industrial production, while business accelerated with the new efficiency and lowered trade barriers.  The Jews were liberated from the ghetto. There was limited resistance; most Germans welcomed the new regime, especially the urban elites, but one sour point was the hostility of the French officials toward  the Roman Catholic Church, the choice of most of the residents. The reforms were permanent. Decades later workers and peasants in the Rhineland often appealed to Jacobinism to oppose unpopular government programs, while the intelligentsia demanded the maintenance of the Napoleonic Code (which was stayed in effect for a century).

Prussian influence

A Prussian influence began on a small scale in 1609 by the occupation of the Duchy of Cleves.  A century later, Upper Guelders and Moers also became Prussian. The Congress of Vienna expelled the French and assigned the whole of the lower Rhenish districts to Prussia, who left them in undisturbed possession of the liberal institutions to which they had become accustomed under the French. The Rhine Province remained part of Prussia after Germany was unified in 1871.

1918–1945

The occupation of the Rhineland took place following the Armistice with Germany of 11 November 1918. The occupying armies consisted of American, Belgian, British and French forces. Under the Treaty of Versailles, German troops were banned from all territory west of the Rhine and within 50 kilometers east of the Rhine.

In 1920, under massive French pressure, the Saar was separated from the Rhine Province and administered by the League of Nations until a plebiscite in 1935, when the region was returned to Germany.  At the same time, in 1920, the districts of Eupen and Malmedy were transferred to Belgium (see German-Speaking Community of Belgium).

Shortly after, France completely occupied the Rhineland, strictly controlling all important industrial areas. The Germans responded with passive resistance and hyperinflation; the French gained very little of the reparations they wanted. French troops did not leave the Rhineland until 1925.

On 7 March 1936, in violation of the Treaty of Versailles, German troops marched into the Rhineland and other regions along the Rhine.  German territory west of the Rhine had been off-limits to the German military.

In 1945, the Rhineland was the scene of major fighting as the Allied forces overwhelmed the German defenders.

Post-1946
In 1946, the Rhineland was divided into the newly founded states of Hesse, North Rhine-Westphalia, and Rhineland-Palatinate. North Rhine-Westphalia is one of the prime German industrial areas, containing significant mineral deposits, (coal, lead, lignite, magnesium, oil, and uranium) and water transport. In Rhineland-Palatinate agriculture is more important, including the vineyards in the Ahr, Mittelrhein, and Mosel regions.

See also

Cologne/Bonn Region
Lower Rhine region
Rhineland-Palatinate
North Rhine-Westphalia
6070 Rheinland

References

Further reading